Corydoras paragua is a tropical freshwater fish belonging to the Corydoradinae sub-family of the family Callichthyidae. It originates in inland waters in South America. Corydoras paragua is found in Bolivia.

References

Knaack, J., 2004. Beschreibung von sechs neuen Arten der Gattung Corydoras La Cépède, 1803 (Teleostei: Siluriformes: Callichthyidae). Zool. Abh., Staat. Mus. Tierk. Dresden 54:55-105.

Corydoras
Catfish of South America
Fish of Bolivia
Taxa named by Joachim Knaack
Fish described in 2004
Tropical fish